Dickensian is a British drama television series that premiered on BBC One from 26 December 2015 to 21 February 2016. The 20-part series, created and co-written by Tony Jordan, brings characters from many Charles Dickens novels together in one Victorian London neighbourhood, as Inspector Bucket investigates the murder of Ebenezer Scrooge's partner Jacob Marley.

Production
Dickensian was commissioned by Danny Cohen and Ben Stephenson. The executive producers are Polly Hill and Tony Jordan, and the production company behind the series is Red Planet Pictures. Red Planet Pictures's Alex Jones vowed to lobby HM Revenue and Customs and the Department for Culture, Media and Sport to relax the tax-relief rules for Dickensian; tax relief is only given for dramas longer than 30 minutes and each episode of Dickensian lasts 30 minutes.

In April 2016, the BBC confirmed that they had cancelled the show after one series.

Cast
The cast includes the following:

Episodes

References to other Dickens characters and works
Honoria Barbary and Martha Cratchit work in a dress-shop, Mantalini's—a reference to Madame Mantalini, a milliner in Nicholas Nickleby. The toy shop in the neighbourhood, Gruff and Tackleton, appears in The Cricket on the Hearth. The coffee-house on the street is Garraway's, frequented in real life by Dickens and appearing in The Pickwick Papers, Martin Chuzzlewit, Little Dorrit, and The Uncommercial Traveller. Amelia Havisham's first dog here is Jip, the spaniel that is Dora Spenlow's lapdog in David Copperfield. Constable Duff, who appears briefly in a few episodes, is a character from Oliver Twist.

Episode 1: Jaggers mentions his clerk "Mr Heep"—Uriah Heep from David Copperfield; Silas Wegg, the tapman at The Three Cripples (a tavern in Oliver Twist), gives barmaid Daisy a tray of drinks to take back to "Mr Pickwick and his guests" (The Pickwick Papers).
At the New Years reception hosted by the Haversham siblings, the tune being played during the dancing is called Sir Roger de Coverly and is played at Fezziwig’s Christmas party in A Christmas Carol.

Episode 4: Jaggers talks of often considering an end to his partnership with Mr Tulkinghorn (from Bleak House).

Episode 6: Scrooge snaps at Cratchit that, in renegotiating terms of a loan, he must surely "have consulted with Jacob Marley's ghost"—a foreshadowing of A Christmas Carol. Mrs Gamp talks of seeing a "Mr Wemmick," like Silas Wegg, go gray and lose his leg—this may be a reference to the father of John Wemmick, in Great Expectations, referred to by his son as "The Aged Parent" or "The Aged P".

Episode 7: In mishearing "Barbary" as "Barnaby," Silas Wegg happens to allude to the title character of Barnaby Rudge. Compeyson's and Matthew Pocket's drunken leaps between rooftops echo Bill Sikes' death in Oliver Twist, when he accidentally hangs himself while trying to descend from a rooftop.

Episode 9: Edward Barbary calls on a Mr Darley for help with his finances, to no avail; the last name suggests F. O. C. Darley, a nineteenth-century American artist who did illustrations for a number of Dickens editions that appeared in the United States.

Episode 10: Honoria's question to her father's creditor, "Have you no heart, Mr Scrooge?", and Mrs Bumble's remark, "'ave you no 'eart, Bumble?", echo the moment in Little Dorrit, Dickens' novel about debtors' prison, when Frederick Dorrit asks Fanny, "Have you no memory? Have you no heart?" They also presage Estella's words in Great Expectations: "You must know . . . that I have no heart—if that has anything to do with my memory."

Episode 12: On leaving the little boy in the care of the Bumbles at the workhouse, Inspector Bucket's parting advice, "Manners are important, and so is standing up for yourself," presages the starving Oliver Twist politely demanding more gruel in the Bumbles' workhouse: "Please, sir, I want some more" (a moment essentially recreated in Episode 19).

Episode 13: When the Artful Dodger visits Fagin in his cell, the image of the man foretells the famous 1839 drawing by George Cruikshank, for Oliver Twist, of "Fagin in the condemned Cell." Honoria learns she is pregnant—the child will be Esther Summerson, the narrator (in some chapters) and main protagonist of Bleak House.

Episode 14: Dodger refers to another of the boys in his gang as "Charley," presumably meaning that said boy is Oliver Twist character Charley Bates. Bob Cratchit says of his son that he "can bear him on my shoulders until [my] strength returns," but in A Christmas Carol he is still bearing Tiny Tim "upon his shoulder". The clergyman (only named in the credits) whom Bill has smuggle a match in to Dodger in gaol is the slimy Reverend Chadband (Bleak House), extorted to do so here because he had relations with Nancy. The "Major Bagstock" on the board of trustees before which Mr Bumble presents himself is a friend of Mr Dombey in Dombey and Son; the churchman on the board (only named in the credits) is Reverend Crisparkle (The Mystery of Edwin Drood).

Episodes 15 and 18: The clerk ordered by Jaggers to find out all he can about Compeyson is Lowten, a clerk in The Pickwick Papers.

Episode 18: The name of the murderer in gaol, Manning, suggests the real-life killer Marie Manning, the inspiration for Mademoiselle Hortense in Bleak House. When Emily Cratchit returns home to gaze gratefully through the window at her family inside, gathered around the table, this moment echoes Scrooge looking in on the Cratchits through the window in Scrooge, the most famous and acclaimed film-adaptation of A Christmas Carol.

Episode 19: The picture that Bumble hangs in the workhouse is of Josiah Bounderby, one of the major characters in Hard Times. One of the school trustees is Mrs Tisher, a character from The Mystery of Edwin Drood. Amelia Havisham gazes at her wedding dress in the mirror—the same dress she will remain in throughout Great Expectations, in a mad, obsessive reminder of Compeyson's betrayal of her; one day, the dress catches fire, Miss Havisham suffers severe burns, and she dies some weeks later.

Episode 20: In an echo of his line in Episode 1, Silas Wegg tells his barmaid, "Daisy, up and get the empties from Mister Pickwick" (of The Pickwick Papers). In reply to Daisy's farewell to him in the tavern, Scrooge mutters, "Humbug," his trademark utterance; Marley's ghost whispers "Ebenezer," as in A Christmas Carol.

Broadcast
Internationally, the series premiered in Australia on BBC First on 7 February 2016, but it was broadcast as 13 45-minute episodes in contrast to the 20 half-hour-long instalments broadcast in the UK.

It also premiered in The Netherlands on BBC First on 5 January 2016.

In Finland the series was broadcast on YLE as ten one-hour episodes beginning 2 December 2016.

In Norway, the series was broadcast on NRK as ten one-hour episodes beginning 26 December 2017.

In Sweden, the series was broadcast on SVT as ten one-hour episodes beginning 2 December 2017.

Critical reception
Reviewing the first episodes in The Guardian Sam Wollaston noted its jumble of characters and events: "Tony Jordan has taken a whole bunch of Dickens characters from their novels and put them into something else. […]. It's like EastEnders meets A Christmas Carol meets Great Expectations meets Oliver Twist meets Bleak House meets Our Mutual Friend, and I've certainly missed some out. Meets Agatha Christie, too, because here's another body – Marley's this time – coshed over the head and left lying in the snow". He added, "The set is beautiful, and there are showy Dickensian performances from a starry cast. It's clever, certainly, and must have been a labour of love, unpicking all these people from their works, weaving them into something else." But he had a problem "with the whole exercise – starting with the characters, someone else's, and then figuring out what they're going to be doing. Are things not better if they grow together, as one, characters, stories, style, themes etc? And the problem with these particular characters is that the new thing is never going to be as good as the thing they came from". He concluded, "And I'm having real problems figuring out what the bleedin' 'ell is going on. It's clear like the fog down by the dock where Fagin lives. It – the fog – does lift a bit; by the end of the second episode (of 20! that’s a big ask), I'm a bit less fuddled. And it begins to pick up momentum of its own. But I wonder how many of the viewers who set off will get this far".

Writing in The Daily Telegraph, Michael Hogan was more impressed, giving the opening two episodes a full five stars: "Jordan put a pacy, playful and subtly sudsy new spin on much-loved material. Its debut double bill left me saying, 'Please, sir, I want some more'". He observed, "Dickensian will unfold in 20 half-hour instalments, its format reminiscent of the BBC's landmark serialisation of Bleak House a decade ago. Such soap-style scheduling isn't far removed from how Dickens told his original stories, published in short instalments with cliffhanger endings, the multiple plot threads drawn inexorably together over time". Hogan concluded, "Jordan is a Dickens super-fan and his love of the great man's works seeped through every line of the sparkling script. This 200-year-old treat in 21st-century wrapping was an ingeniously conceived, handsomely crafted gift - signed, with love, from Jordan and Dickens. Consider this my thank-you letter".

In The Independent on Sunday, Amy Burns found the opening episodes to be a "brilliant BBC re-imagining" and a "clever and compelling Dickens mash-up". She praised Stephen Rea for playing Inspector Bucket "utterly faultlessly", adding, "His mannerisms and vocal intonation were absolutely spot-on and the script was excellent".

For Radio Times' Ben Dowell, "the first and most obvious question to ask is this: they may have the same names and look like they are described in the books, but who are these people? Can they really be said to be Dickens characters? The great Victorian novelist invented these richly-drawn characters to fit into the novels he wrote. He was a storyteller, first and foremost, someone who wrote episodic narratives driven by the unstoppable force of his ingeniously-crafted plots. He populated his books with amazing characters, of course, but tearing them away from their stories is to essentially denude them of their essential life and being". He compared the opening episodes to "a weird Doctor Who episode where the Doctor enters some kind of weird alien dream world populated by characters formed from half-remembered dreams of his reading of English Victorian literature".  Conceding that "Jordan has also rather cleverly managed to fashion a whodunit plot out of the death of Marley", Dowell decided, "if I am honest I am not sure I will be hanging around to find out more. This is fast-paced, well written soapy drama. But it's also, for me, a messy pudding that is – but really isn't – Dickens".

References

External links

BBC television dramas
2010s British drama television series
2015 British television series debuts
2016 British television series endings
Television shows set in the United Kingdom
English-language television shows
Television shows based on works by Charles Dickens